Data in transit, also referred to as data in motion and data in flight, is data en route between source and destination, typically on a computer network. 

Data in transit can be separated into two categories: information that flows over the public or untrusted network such as the Internet and data that flows in the confines of a private network such as a corporate or enterprise local area network (LAN). 

Data in transit is used as a complement to the terms data in use, and data at rest which together define the three states of digital data.

See also
Bandwidth-delay product

References

Computer networks